The Garajau Partial Nature Reserve is a Portuguese marine reserve located on the Funchal Bay offshore Madeira Island. The protected area 
has existed since 1986. 

It is a location for snorkelling and scuba-diving. Dive centres exist in the Garajau Reserve. The Garajau reserve is listed on ‘the MPA Global’ a marine-focused database of the world's protected areas that have some intertidal and/or subtidal component.

Marine species that can be seen in the Garajau Reserve include dusky groupers (Epinephelus marginatus), moray eels (Muraena helena) and garden eels (Taenioconger longissimus). Hunting and fishing are forbidden within the Madeiran marine reserves. The second marine nature reserve in Madeira is on the north coast of the island: Rocha do Navio.

References

Protected areas of Portugal
Geography of Madeira
Tourist attractions in Madeira